Wells House may refer to:

United States 
(ordered by state then city)
Wells House (Prescott, Arizona), a property listed on the National Register of Historic Places (NRHP) in Arizona
John Wells Jr. House, in West Hartford, Connecticut, listed on the NRHP in Connecticut
Green Gables (Melbourne, Florida) in Melbourne, Florida, also known as the Wells House, listed on NRHP in Florida
Ida B. Wells-Barnett House, a National Historic Landmark in Chicago, Illinois
George A. Wells House, in Fairfield, Iowa, listed on the NRHP in Iowa
Wells House (North Adams, Massachusetts), listed on the NRHP in Massachusetts
Charles Wells House, in Reading, Massachusetts, listed on the NRHP in Massachusetts
John M. Wells House, in Southbridge, Massachusetts, listed on the NRHP in Massachusetts
George B. and Ruth D. Wells House, in Southbridge, Massachusetts, listed on the NRHP in Massachusetts
H.C. Wells Double House, in Southbridge, Massachusetts, listed on the NRHP in Massachusetts
Lorenzo Palmer and Ruth Wells House, in Hudson, Michigan, listed on the NRHP in Michigan
William H. Wells House, in Detroit, Michigan, listed on the NRHP in Michigan
J. M. Wells House, in Petoskey, Michigan, listed on the NRHP in Michigan
J. Stuart Wells House, in Binghamton, New York, listed on the NRHP in Broome County
Joshua Wells House, in Cutchogue, New York, listed on the NRHP in New York
George A. Wells Jr. House, in Independence, Oregon, listed on the NRHP in Oregon
William Bittle Wells House, in Portland, Oregon, listed on the NRHP in Oregon
Reed–Wells House, listed on the NRHP in Portland, Oregon
Osborne Wells House, in Newberry, South Carolina, listed on the NRHP in South Carolina
Hannah Wells House, in Park City, Utah, listed on the NRHP in Utah
Edward Wells House, in Burlington, Vermont, listed on the NRHP in Vermont
Wells House (Wenatchee, Washington), a property listed on the National Register of Historic Places in Washington
William Wells House, in Tyler City, West Virginia, listed on the NRHP in West Virginia

Other 
Wells House, Ilkley, West Yorkshire, England
Wells House (Wexford, Ireland), Kilmuckridge, Co. Wexford, Ireland

See also
Welles House (disambiguation)